Edith Minturn Sedgwick Post (April 20, 1943 – November 16, 1971) was an American actress and fashion model, known for being one of Andy Warhol's superstars. Sedgwick became known as "The Girl of the Year" in 1965 after starring in several of Warhol's short films in the 1960s. She was dubbed an "It Girl", while Vogue magazine also named her a "Youthquaker".

Sedgwick broke with Warhol in 1966, and attempted to forge an independent acting career. However, her mental health deteriorated from drug abuse, and she struggled to complete the semi-autobiographical film Ciao! Manhattan. She gave up drugs and alcohol after meeting her future husband Michael Post, and completed filming Ciao! Manhattan in early 1971. Post and Sedgwick married in July 1971; she died four months later of an overdose at age 28.

Early life and education
Edie Sedgwick was born in Santa Barbara, California, the seventh of eight children of Alice Delano de Forest (1908–1988) and Francis Minturn Sedgwick (1904–1967), a rancher and sculptor, and a member of the historical Sedgwick family of Massachusetts. Sedgwick's mother, Alice, was the daughter of Henry Wheeler de Forest, the president and chairman of the board of the Southern Pacific Railroad. She was named after her father's aunt, Edith Minturn Stokes, who was famously painted with her husband, Isaac Newton Phelps Stokes, by John Singer Sargent. She was of English and French Huguenot ancestry.

Despite the family's wealth and high social status, Sedgwick's early life was troubled. The Sedgwick children were raised on the family's California ranches. Initially schooled at home and cared for by nannies, their lives were rigidly controlled by their parents. They were largely isolated from the outside world, and it was instilled into them that they were superior to most of their peers. It was within these familial and social conditions that Sedgwick by her early teens developed an eating disorder, settling into an early pattern of binging and purging. At age 13 (the year her grandfather Henry Dwight Sedgwick died), Sedgwick began boarding at the Branson School near San Francisco. According to her older sister Alice "Saucie" Sedgwick, she was soon taken out of the school because of the eating disorder. Her father severely restricted her freedom when she returned home.

All the Sedgwick children had conflicted relationships with their father (whom they called "Fuzzy"). By most accounts, he was narcissistic, emotionally remote, controlling, and frequently abusive. He also openly carried on affairs with other women. On one occasion, Edie walked in on him while he was having sex with one of his mistresses. She reacted with great surprise, but he claimed that she had imagined it, slapped her, and called a doctor to administer tranquilizers to her. As an adult, Sedgwick told people that he had attempted to molest her several times, beginning when she was seven.

In 1958, her parents enrolled her at St. Timothy's School in Maryland. She was eventually taken out of the school due to an eating disorder that had progressed to anorexia.

In the autumn of 1962, at her father's insistence, Sedgwick was committed to the private Silver Hill psychiatric hospital in New Canaan, Connecticut. As the regime was very lax, Sedgwick easily manipulated the situation at Silver Hill, and her weight kept dropping. She was later sent to Bloomingdale, the Westchester County, New York division of New York Hospital, where her anorexia improved markedly. Around the time she left the hospital, she had a brief relationship with a Harvard student, became pregnant, and procured an abortion, citing her present psychological issues.

In the autumn of 1963, Sedgwick moved to Cambridge, Massachusetts and began studying sculpture with her cousin, artist Lily Saarinen. According to Saarinen, Sedgwick "was very insecure about men, though all the men loved her." During this period, she partied with members of an elite bohemian fringe of the Harvard social scene.

Sedgwick was deeply affected by the loss of her older brothers, Francis Jr. (known as "Minty") and Robert (known as "Bobby"), who died within 18 months of each other. Francis Sedgwick, who had a particularly unhappy relationship with their father, suffered several breakdowns, eventually dying by suicide in 1964 while committed at Silver Hill Hospital. Her second oldest brother, Robert, also suffered from mental health problems and died when his motorcycle crashed into the side of a New York City bus on New Year's Eve 1965.

The Factory
On her twenty-first birthday in April 1964, Sedgwick received an $80,000 trust fund from her maternal grandmother. Soon after, she relocated to New York City to pursue a career in modeling. In March 1965, she met artist and avant-garde filmmaker Andy Warhol at a party at Lester Persky's apartment, and began frequently visiting The Factory, Warhol's art studio in Midtown Manhattan. During one of her subsequent visits, Warhol was filming Vinyl (1965), his interpretation of Anthony Burgess' novel A Clockwork Orange. Despite Vinyls all-male cast, Warhol put Sedgwick in the movie. Around this time, she also made a small cameo appearance in another Warhol film, Horse (1965). Sedgwick's appearances in both films were brief but generated enough interest that Warhol decided to cast her in the starring role of his next films.

The first of these avant-garde films, Poor Little Rich Girl (1965), was originally conceived as part of a series of films featuring Sedgwick called The Poor Little Rich Girl Saga. The series was to include Poor Little Rich Girl, Restaurant, Face and Afternoon. Filming of Poor Little Rich Girl began in March 1965 in Sedgwick's apartment; it depicted her going about her daily routines. Sedgwick's next film for Warhol was Kitchen, which was filmed in May 1965 but was not released until 1966. Written by Factory scriptwriter Ronald Tavel, the film stars Sedgwick, Rene Ricard, Roger Trudeau, Donald Lyons and Elecktrah. After Kitchen, Chuck Wein replaced Ronald Tavel as a writer and assistant director for the filming of Beauty No. 2 (1965), which was filmed in June and premiered in July 1965. The film shows Sedgwick lounging on a bed in her underwear with Gino Piserchio and being taunted by Chuck Wein off-screen.

Warhol's films were for the most part shown only in underground film theaters and in viewings held at The Factory, and were not commercially successful. Regardless, Sedgwick began receiving attention from the mainstream media, who reported on her appearances in the films and on her personal style. During this period, she developed a distinct look including black leotards, mini dresses, large chandelier earrings, and heavy eye make-up. Sedgwick also cut her naturally brown hair short and dyed it with silver spray, thus matching her look with Warhol's, who was known for wearing silvery hair pieces. Warhol dubbed Sedgwick his "Superstar", and they began appearing together at various public events.

Sedgwick and Warhol continued making films together —Outer and Inner Space, Prison, Lupe and Chelsea Girls— throughout 1965. The edited footage of Sedgwick in Chelsea Girls would eventually become the film Afternoon. Their relationship deteriorated by late 1965, and Sedgwick demanded that Warhol stop showing her films.

Lupe is often thought to be Sedgwick's last Warhol film, but she filmed The Andy Warhol Story with Rene Ricard in November 1966, almost a year after finishing Lupe. The Andy Warhol Story was an unreleased film that was only screened once at The Factory. Along with Sedgwick, the film featured Ricard satirically pretending to be Andy Warhol.

Post-Factory years
Following her estrangement from Warhol's inner circle, Sedgwick began living at the Chelsea Hotel, where she became close to Bob Dylan. Dylan and his friends eventually convinced Sedgwick to sign up with Albert Grossman, Dylan's manager. According to Paul Morrissey, Sedgwick had developed a crush on Dylan that she thought he reciprocated. She was also under the impression that she and Dylan would star in a mainstream film together. Unbeknownst to Sedgwick, Dylan had secretly married his girlfriend Sara Lownds in November 1965. Morrissey claimed that Sedgwick was informed of the marriage by Warhol (who reportedly heard about it through his lawyer) in February 1966. Friends of Sedgwick's later said that she saw the supposed offer of doing a film with Dylan as a ticket to a mainstream film career. Paul Morrissey claimed that Dylan likely never had plans to star in a film with Sedgwick, and Dylan "hadn't been very truthful."

Since Sedgwick's death, Bob Dylan has routinely denied that he ever had a romantic relationship with her, but did acknowledge knowing her. In December 2006, several weeks before the release of the controversial film Factory Girl, the Weinstein Company and the film's producers interviewed Sedgwick's older brother, Jonathan, who said that Sedgwick told him she had aborted a baby she claimed was Dylan's. Jonathan Sedgwick claimed that Edie had the abortion soon after she was injured in a motorcycle accident. As a result of the accident, doctors consigned her to a mental hospital where she was treated for drug addiction. No hospital records or Sedgwick family records exist to support this story. Nonetheless, Sedgwick's brother also claimed "Staff found she was pregnant but, fearing the baby had been damaged by her drug use and anorexia, forced her to have the abortion."

In 1966, Sedgwick was named one of the "fashion revolutionaries" in New York by Women's Wear Daily, alongside Tiger Morse, Baby Jane Holzer, Pierre Cardin, Paco Rabanne, Rudi Gernreich, André Courrèges, Emanuel Ungaro, Yves Saint Laurent, and Mary Quant.

Throughout most of 1966, Sedgwick was involved in an intense but troubled relationship with Dylan's friend Bob Neuwirth. During this time, she became increasingly dependent on barbiturates. In early 1967, unable to cope with Sedgwick's drug abuse and erratic behavior, Neuwirth broke off their relationship.

Later years
After breaking with Andy Warhol and The Factory scene, Sedgwick attempted to forge a legitimate acting career. She auditioned for Norman Mailer when the stage adaptation of his novel The Deer Park was being produced. But Mailer "turned her down....—She was very good in a sort of tortured and wholly sensitive way—...She used so much of herself with every line that we knew she'd be immolated after three performances."

As fast as Diana Vreeland of Vogue had been to cast aside Edie the young American aristocrat, she now pounced on a teen-age working-class girl from England, Twiggy, whose arrival in New York in March 1967 caused nearly riotous events among young American followers of style and fashion. In that same month, March 1967, Sedgwick began what may have seemed propitious but in fact began her torturous and final decline: the shooting of Ciao! Manhattan, a semi-autobiographical underground film co-directed by John Palmer and David Weisman. During this, she accidentally set her room on fire in the Chelsea Hotel and was briefly hospitalized with burns. Due to Sedgwick's rapidly deteriorating health from drug use, the film was suspended. After further hospitalizations for drug abuse and mental issues in 1968 and 1969, Sedgwick returned to her family's ranch in California to recuperate. In August 1969, she was hospitalized again in the psychiatric ward of the Santa Barbara Cottage Hospital after being arrested for drug offenses by the local police. While in the hospital, Sedgwick met another patient, Michael Brett Post, whom she would marry in July 1971.

Sedgwick was hospitalized again in the summer of 1970 but was let out under the supervision of a psychiatrist, two nurses, and the live-in care of filmmaker John Palmer and his wife Janet. Determined to finish Ciao! Manhattan and have her story told, Sedgwick reconnected with the film crew and began shooting in Arcadia and Santa Barbara in late 1970. She also recorded audio tapes reflecting on her life story: accounts Weisman and Palmer incorporated into the film's dramatic arc. Filming completed in early 1971, and the film was released in February 1972.

Marriage and death
In the summer of 1970, Sedgwick met Michael Post, who was a fellow patient at the Santa Barbara Cottage Hospital. They married on July 24, 1971. During this time she gave up drugs and alcohol, but in October 1971, she relapsed after taking prescription pain medication given to her for a physical illness, which in turn led to abusing barbiturates and alcohol.

On the night of November 15, 1971, Sedgwick went to a fashion show at the Santa Barbara Museum that included a segment filmed for the television show An American Family. After the fashion show, she attended a party where she drank alcohol. She then phoned her husband to pick her up. On the way home, Sedgwick expressed thoughts of uncertainty about their marriage. Before they both fell asleep, Post gave Sedgwick the medication that had been prescribed for her. According to Post, Sedgwick started to fall asleep very quickly and her breathing was "bad – it sounded like there was a big hole in her lungs", but he attributed it to her heavy smoking habit and went to sleep.

When Post awoke the following morning at 7:30 a.m., he found Sedgwick dead. The coroner ruled her death as "undetermined/accident/suicide". Her death certificate states the immediate cause was "probable acute barbiturate intoxication" due to ethanol intoxication. Sedgwick's alcohol level was registered at 0.17% and her barbiturate level was 0.48 mg%. She was 28.

Sedgwick was not buried in her family's Sedgwick Pie cemetery plot but in the small Oak Hill Cemetery in Ballard, California. Her epitaph reads "Edith Sedgwick Post – Wife Of Michael Brett Post 1943–1971".

In popular culture

Music 
Edie Sedgwick has been inspiration for a number of songs.
 Bob Dylan's "Just Like a Woman", "Leopard-Skin Pill-Box Hat" and "Fourth Time Around" from his 1966 album Blonde on Blonde are reportedly about Sedgwick. Reportedly, his 1965 No. 2 single "Like a Rolling Stone" was also inspired by her.
 The Velvet Underground's "Femme Fatale" from their 1967 album The Velvet Underground & Nico was written about Sedgwick.
 Sedgwick appears on the cover of Dramarama's 1985 debut album Cinéma Vérité. The music video for the album's first single "Anything, Anything (I'll Give You)"  features clips of her in Ciao! Manhattan.
 The lyrics of the 1986 Primal Scream song "Velocity Girl" were inspired by Sedgwick.
 In 1985, Dream Academy released a 7" single "The Love Parade" in the US with the b-side "Girl In A Million (For Edie Sedgwick)" on Reprise Records.
 The second track from the Edie Brickell & New Bohemians' 1988 album Shooting Rubberbands at the Stars is titled "Little Miss S." and is about Sedgwick.
 "Edie (Ciao Baby)" is a hard rock song by English band The Cult. It appeared on their fourth studio album Sonic Temple in 1989. The cover of the single features a photograph from Ciao! Manhattan.
 The 7th song on Tal Cohen-Shalev's 2009 Heartaches and Ashes is dedicated to Sedgwick and called "Factory Girl (Song for Edie Sedgwick)".
 Alizée's 2010 album Une Enfant Du Siècle was inspired by and depicts Sedgwick's life.
 On the 2010 album 13 Most Beautiful: Songs for Andy Warhol's Screen Tests by Dean & Britta, the fifth track, "It Don't Rain in Beverly Hills", was written to accompany Warhol's screen test for Sedgwick.
 The Pretty Reckless’ song "Factory Girl" on their 2010 debut album Light Me Up is based on Edie Sedgwick and her life in the factory. In 2009 lead singer Taylor Momsen said “Edie Sedgwick had a cool style; she pushed the envelope for the time.“
 Lady Gaga's "Applause" and "Marry the Night" music videos include references to Edie Sedgwick and the film Ciao! Manhattan.
 Rapper G-Eazy's 2014 song "Downtown Love" is based on Sedgwick's life story.
 Beach House's 2018 album, 7, was inspired by Sedgwick's life and icon status, in particular its penultimate track "Girl of the Year."
 The band Deadbolt released the Sedgwick-inspired song "Edie" on its 1992 debut EP, Creepy World.

Other 
 Sedgwick popularized the mini-skirt by purchasing children's skirts and wearing them as her own.
 The previously niche phrase "Superstar" was popularized and became a mainstream term because of Sedgwick being dubbed one by Andy Warhol and the increased mainstream media attention the pair received. Sedgwick can be seen defining the term on the Merv Griffin Show, indicating that the word was not a staple in the general public's vocabulary before her appearance on the show.
 Warren Beatty bought the rights to Sedgwick's life story in the 1980s and was planning to make a movie, initially with Molly Ringwald then with Jennifer Jason Leigh starring as Sedgwick. Al Pacino was tapped to play Andy Warhol. It was also reported that a film titled The War at Home was to be loosely based on her life during The Factory years, with Linda Fiorentino slated to portray her. It was to be based on John Byrum's fictionalized account of a working-class man who becomes enamored of her. Neither was ever produced.
 Actress and model Jennifer Rubin played Sedgwick in the 1991 film The Doors, directed by Oliver Stone.
 The Escape Artist is a 1994 novel by a Madrid-based writer, Jonathan Holland. The villain of the novel is a character called Marc, about whom it is said: "He'd spent most of his teens working with Andy Warhol and Paul Morrissey, and he'd slept with someone called Edie Sedgwick: apparently Jean Shrimpton was not the only beautiful woman in the world with the name of a dinner lady."  All of Marc's life-story is false.
 In the 2002 film Igby Goes Down, Amanda Peet's character, Rachel, is described as an "Edie Sedgwick wanna-be" and dresses in Sedgwick-inspired attire throughout the film.
 A 2004 off-Broadway play entitled Andy & Edie was written and produced by Peter Braunstein.  It ran for 10 days. Misha Moore, who portrayed Sedgwick, claimed to be the late model's niece. At the request of the Sedgwick family, The New York Times published a notice of correction.
 Director Mike Nichols and actress Natalie Portman considered doing a film about Sedgwick and Andy Warhol but decided to film an adaptation of Patrick Marber's play Closer instead, which was released in 2004.
 Sienna Miller played Sedgwick in George Hickenlooper's film Factory Girl, a fictionalized account of Sedgwick's life, released in December 2006. The film portrays Warhol, played by Guy Pearce, as a cynic who leads Sedgwick into a downward spiral of drug addiction and psychiatric problems. Hayden Christensen plays "Billy Quinn", an apparent conglomeration of various characters but a look-alike of Bob Dylan. (As of late 2006, Dylan was apparently threatening to pursue a defamation lawsuit, claiming the film implicates him as having driven Sedgwick to her death.) Michael Post, Sedgwick's widower, appears as a taxi driver in one of the last scenes of the film.

Filmography

Bibliography
 Victor Bockris and Gerard Malanga: Uptight: The Velvet Underground Story
 Victor Bockris: Andy Warhol
 Michael Opray: Andy Warhol. Film Factory
 Jean Stein: Edie: American Girl
 Andy Warhol: The Philosophy of Andy Warhol
 Melissa Painter and David Weisman: Edie: Girl on Fire Book and Film
 Steven Watson: Factory Made: Warhol And the Sixties
 Nat Finkelstein and David Dalton: Edie: Factory Girl
 John Sedgwick: In My Blood: Six Generations of Madness and Desire in an American Family

References

External links

 
 Blast magazine article "Girl on Fire"

1943 births
1971 deaths
20th-century American actresses
Actresses from New York City
Actresses from Santa Barbara, California
Female models from California
American artists
American film actresses
American people of English descent
American people of French descent
American socialites
Burials in California
Delano family
Drug-related deaths in California
Barbiturates-related deaths
Sedgwick family
Muses
People associated with The Factory
Radcliffe College alumni
Unsolved deaths in the United States
Winthrop family